Calosima is a gelechioid moth genus of the family Blastobasidae.

Species

 Calosima albafasciata Adamski, 2002
 Calosima albafaciella
 Calosima albapenella
 Calosima alienigenae
 Calosima arguta
 Calosima argyrosplendella
 Calosima ancorae
 Calosima audentiae
 Calosima carinae
 Calosima citharae
 Calosima dianella
 Calosima darwini Adamski & Landry, 1997
 Calosima elyella
 Calosima fabulae
 Calosima fallaciae
 Calosima favillae
 Calosima flammae
 Calosima furiae
 Calosima helicae
 Calosima illicis
 Calosima laureae
 Calosima lepidophaga
 Calosima lucidella
 Calosima malikuli Adamski, 2002
 Calosima medusae
 Calosima megarae
 Calosima melanostriatella
 Calosima moriutii Adamski, 2002
 Calosima munroei
 Calosima orbae
 Calosima orthophrontis
 Calosima paterae
 Calosima sepulturae
 Calosima tesserae

References

 
Blastobasidae genera